William Molter (June 2, 1910 – April 2, 1960) was an American National Champion and Hall of Fame horse trainer in the sport of Thoroughbred racing.

A native of Fredericksburg, Texas, Molter began his career in horse racing as a jockey at racetracks across the Texas border in Mexico. He eventually made his way to the bush tracks of Western Canada and at the modern Polo Park Racetrack in Winnipeg, Manitoba won the 1935 edition of the Manitoba Stakes, now known as the Canadian Derby. That year he turned to training horses, making his way to the modern new racetracks being built in California where he enjoyed considerable success. He was the United States Champion Thoroughbred Trainer by wins four straight years between 1946 and 1949, and led all American trainers in earnings four times, winning the title in 1954, 1956, 1958, and 1959.

During his career, Molter trained for prominent owners such as Elizabeth Arden, Andrew J. Crevolin, Travis M. Kerr, and film mogul, Louis B. Mayer. Among the horses Molter trained were 1947 Santa Anita Derby winner, On Trust, 1956 Santa Anita Handicap winner Bobby Brocato, and Imbros, who set a new world record of 1:20.60 for 7 furlongs in winning the 1954 Malibu Sequet Stakes. In addition, Molter won the 1954 Kentucky Derby with Determine but his most famous horse was 1958 American Horse of the Year and Hall of Fame inductee, Round Table who retired at the end of the 1959 racing season having earned a world record US$1,749,869.

Molter died on April 2, 1960, of a massive cerebral stroke. That year, the United States' National Museum of Racing inducted him in their Hall of Fame.

References
 William Molter at the United States' National Museum of Racing and Hall of Fame
 April 3, 1960 Spokesman-Review article titled "Willie Molter Dies"

1910 births
1960 deaths
American horse trainers
United States Thoroughbred Racing Hall of Fame inductees
People from Fredericksburg, Texas